Vicks VapoRub is a mentholated topical ointment, part of the Vicks brand of over-the-counter medications owned by the American consumer goods company Procter & Gamble.
VapoRub is intended for use on the chest, back and throat for cough suppression or on muscles and joints for minor aches and pains. Users of VapoRub often apply it immediately before sleep.

First sold in 1905, VapoRub was originally manufactured by the family-owned company Richardson-Vicks, Inc., based in Greensboro, North Carolina. Richardson-Vicks was sold to Procter & Gamble in 1985 and is now known as Vicks. VapoRub is also manufactured and packaged in India and Mexico. In German-speaking countries (apart from Switzerland), it is sold under the name Wick VapoRub to avoid brand blundering, as "Vicks" when pronounced in German would sound similar to the vulgar word fick. VapoRub continues to be Vicks's flagship product internationally, and the Vicks brand name is often used synonymously with the VapoRub product.

History
The product can be traced to Jules Bengue, a French pharmacist, who created Ben-Gay, a menthol-based treatment for arthritis, gout and neuralgia. Lunsford Richardson, a pharmacist in Selma, North Carolina, sold Ben-Gay and heard from his customers that it cleared their sinuses. He blended menthol into petroleum jelly, at first calling it Richardson's Croup and Pneumonia Cure Salve, later changing the name to Vicks VapoRub. It was named after Richardson's brother-in-law, Joshua Vick, a physician who had arranged for Richardson to have access to a laboratory to create the product. Richardson began selling it in 1905, renaming it Vaporub in 1912. In 2019, Vicks re-introduced VapoCream, a cream version of VapoRub - which was previously discontinued in the early 2000s.

The product is a cultural touchstone among Hispanic and Latino Americans.

Usage

VapoRub can be inhaled with hot steam. Any oil-based product can get into the lungs if used improperly.

In pre-clinical animal studies, the application of Vicks VapoRub directly onto the tracheae of ferrets caused an increase in mucus production compared to a water-based lubricant.

A Penn State study showed Vicks VapoRub to be more effective than placebo petroleum rub for helping cough and congestion with regard to helping children and adults sleep. However, the study also showed that, unlike with the petroleum rub placebo, Vicks VapoRub was associated with burning sensations to the skin (28%), nose (14%) and eyes (16%), with 5% of study participants reporting redness and rash when using the product. The study's first author is a paid consultant for Procter & Gamble, maker of VapoRub.

A study conducted in 1994 suggests menthol and camphor are effective cough suppressants for guinea pigs. It has been suggested that thymol oil can reduce or cure onychomycosis (nail fungus), although the same source mentions that "no human studies have been conducted to test whether thymol is a lasting and effective treatment".

Ingredients

The ingredients, as listed on older product labels, are: camphor, methanol, spirits of turpentine, oil of eucalyptus, cedarwood, nutmeg, and thymol, all "in a specially balanced Vick formula".

United States
Active ingredients:
''Label reads: Active Ingredients (Purpose)

Regular:

Lemon:

Inactive ingredients

Regular & Lemon:
 cedarleaf oil
 nutmeg oil
 petrolatum
 thymol
 turpentine oil
Lemon:
 lemon fragrance

India
In India, Vicks VapoRub is made by Procter & Gamble (P&G). The formulation is almost the same as the one stated above. P&G claims Vicks Vaporub to be an Ayurvedic medicine, as indicated on the package. The ingredients (per 100 g of product) are stated as follows:

See also
 Aromatherapy
 Chest rub
 Essential oil
 Levomethamphetamine (Vicks Inhaler)
 Mentholatum
 Tiger Balm

References

External links

 Official site

Ointments
Products introduced in 1905
Vicks brands